The 1936 British Lions tour of Argentina was a series of rugby union matches arranged between the British Lions and various Argentine teams. The tourists played ten matches, nine of which were against club and combined teams while one match took in a full Argentina national team. Despite being sanctioned by the International Rugby Board, no caps were awarded to players from either side.

This was the third and final international tour to South America by a combined British team, and although classed as the British Lions, it was predominantly English, with a handful of Scottish and Irish players.

The Lions won all the games played, scoring 399 points and conceding only 12.

Background
By 1936 Argentine rugby was in expansion and growth. Four years earlier, the Junior Springboks had visited the country to play several matches. In 1933 two South African players, Wollie Wolheim and Rybeck Elliot returned to Argentina to play for local team Hindú, which was considered by the Argentine Union as a sort of professionalism and Hindú was suspended for one season.

In 1935 eleven players of San Isidro (the most important rugby team of Argentina by then) were suspended by the club executives. The banned players organised some friendly matches under the name "Abelleyra XV" until they established a new institution, San Isidro Club.

The last Lions tour to Argentina came when former player Douglas Prentice, who had led the team during their tour to New Zealand an Australia in 1930 and was the current manager, arrived with twenty-three players. No Welsh players were part of the team despite Wales had won the Home Nations that year.

The British played only one test v. Argentina at Gimnasia y Esgrima, with a record attendance of 15,000, on August 16th. The Lions won by 23–0. The Argentine line-up for that game was Héctor Alfonso; R. Elliot, Herbert Talbot, Horacio Pascuali, Emilio Schiavio; Percy Talbot, N.W. Cooper; Jorge Cilley, Gilbert Logan, José Frigoli; J.L. Francombe (cap), Tomás Salzman; Bernardo Mitchelstein, Víctor Inchausti, Archie Cameron.

Belgrano was the only team to score a try against The Lions, when the visiting team won by 37–3.

Touring party
 Doug Prentice (Leicester), Manager
 Dr. Hugh Llewellyn Glyn Hughes (Blackheath), Referee

Players

Bernard Gadney (Leicester) Captain
Charles Beamish (Leicester)
John Alfred Brett (Oxford University)
Vesey Boyle (Dublin University).
John Gordon A'Bear (Gloucester)
Owen Chadwick (Cambridge University)
Paul Cooke (Oxford University)
Philip Edward Dunkley ("Pop Dunkley", Harlequins)
George Edward Hancock (Birkenhead Park)
Peter George Hobbs  (Richmond)
P. C. Hordern (Gloucester)
Thomas Frederick Huskisson (Old Merchant Taylors)
Tom Knowles (Birkenhead Park)
J. S. Moll (Lloyds Bank)
Alexander Obolensky (Oxford University)
D. E. Pratten (Blackheath)
Robin Prescott (Harlequins)
Wilson Shaw (Glasgow High School)
John Tallent (Blackheath)
Harold John Uren (Waterloo)
Jim Unwin (Rosslyn Park)
Jock Waters (Selkirk)
William Henry Weston (Northampton)

Notes

Match summary 
Complete list of matches played by the British Isles in Argentina:

 Test match

Match details

Argentina Test

References

British Lions tour of Argentina
British & Irish Lions tours
Rugby union tours of Argentina
Tour
1935–36 in British rugby union
1936 in Irish sport
History of rugby union matches between Argentina and the British & Irish Lions